Pat Hogan (born Thurman Lee Haas; February 3, 1920 – November 21, 1966) was an American actor. He mostly played Native Americans over the course of his career. He was best known for his portrayal of Chief Red Stick in the film Davy Crockett, King of the Wild Frontier (1955).

Career 
Born in Oklahoma to Claude Red Elk and Ann McTigue, Hogan was a member of the Oneida tribe. He attended Roosevelt High School in St. Louis and Pasadena Junior College, where he studied art. 

He appeared in many western  television series and a few movies. Onstage, he starred in Arrowhead (1953), The Last Frontier  (1955), Indian Paint  (1965). Indian Paint starred his brothers-in-law, Johnny Crawford and Robert L. "Bobby" Crawford Jr. He was married to their sister, who now goes by the name of Nance Crawford. She was listed in his obituary as Nancy Scott. Three children survive, including Shawna, Brian, and Kathie.

Hogan debuted on film in Fix Bayonets (1952).

In 1954, Hogan portrayed Chief Red Stick in Walt Disney's "Davy Crockett, Indian Fighter" starring Fess Parker. In 1955, at 34, Hogan played the role of 20-year-old Crawford Goldsby, or the outlaw Cherokee Bill, in the syndicated television series, Stories of the Century, starring and narrated by Jim Davis. Hogan then portrayed Black Cloud in the CBS series Brave Eagle (1955–56) starring Keith Larsen in the title role. He played Sam Peachpit in the syndicated Casey Jones (1957) and Rivas in the NBC adventure series Northwest Passage (1958). 

In the 1950s and 1960s, he guest-starred in such programs as The Rifleman, Gunsmoke, Broken Arrow, Crossroads, Zorro, Daniel Boone and Texas John Slaughter. His last appearance was in the film Indian Paint (1965) with Jay Silverheels.

In the mid-1950s, Hogan was married to dancer Jacquelyn Gibson.

Death 
He died from lung cancer on November 21, 1966, in Los Angeles, California.

Filmography

References 

50 Years of the Television Western, by Ronald Jackson, Doug Abbott.

External links 
 

1920 births
1966 deaths
20th-century American male actors
American male film actors
American male television actors
Native American male actors
Male actors from Oklahoma
People from Pottawatomie County, Oklahoma
Potawatomi people
Oneida people
Burials at San Fernando Mission Cemetery